The history of Mesopotamia extends from the Lower Paleolithic period until the establishment of the Caliphate in the late 7th century AD, after which the region came to be known as Iraq. This list covers dynasties and monarchs of Mesopotamia up until the fall of the Neo-Babylonian Empire in 539 BC, after which native Mesopotamian monarchs never again ruled the region.

The earliest records of writing are known from the Uruk period (or "Protoliterate period") in the 4th millennium BC, with documentation of actual historical events, and the ancient history of the region, being known from the middle of the third millennium BC onwards, alongside cuneiform records written by early kings. This period, known as the Early Dynastic Period, is typically subdivided into three: 2900–2750 BC (ED I), 2750–2600 BC (ED II) and 2600–2350 BC (ED III), and was followed by Akkadian (~2350–2100 BC) and Neo-Sumerian (2112–2004 BC) periods, after which Mesopotamia was most often divided between Assyria in the north and Babylonia in the south. In 609 BC, after about a century of the kings of the Neo-Assyrian Empire ruling both Assyria and Babylonia, the Neo-Babylonian Empire destroyed Assyria and became the sole power in Mesopotamia. The conquest of Babylon by the Achaemenid Empire in 539 BC initiated centuries of Iranian rule (under the Achaemenid, Parthian and Sasanian empires), which was only briefly interrupted by the Hellenistic Argeads and Seleucids (331–141 BC) and the Roman Empire (AD 116–117).

This list follows the middle chronology, the most widely used chronology of Mesopotamian history.

Early dynastic period (c. 2900–2350 BC) 
Before the rise of the Akkadian Empire in the 24th century BC, Mesopotamia was fragmented into a number of city states. Whereas some surviving Mesopotamian documents, such as the Sumerian King List, describe this period as one where there was only one legitimate king at any one given time, and kingship was transferred from city to city sequentially, the historical reality was that there were often many political leaders at any one given time. The Sumerian King List is generally not regarded as historically reliable given the exaggerated reign lengths (some rulers are described as ruling for hundreds or even thousands of years) and the fact that out of the massive amount of pre-Akkadian rulers listed in the SKL, very few are actually attested in surviving evidence from the Early Dynastic period. It is considered most appropriate by modern scholars to rely solely on actual Early Dynastic sources for reconstructing historical events during the Early Dynastic period. As such, the table below only lists rulers whose existence is attested by other more contemporary sources.

Akkadian and Neo-Sumerian periods (c. 2334–2004 BC)

Isin–Larsa and rise of Babylon (c. 2025–1750 BC)

Fragmentation of Babylonia (c. 1749–1475 BC)

Babylonia and Assyria (c. 1475–539 BC)

See also 
 Chronology of the ancient Near East
 List of kings of Akkad
 List of Assyrian kings
 List of kings of Babylon
 Sumerian King List
 List of monarchs of Persia
 List of rulers of Elam
 List of pharaohs
 List of Hittite kings
 Mitanni

Notes

References

Bibliography

Web sources

Dynasties
Mes
Mesopotamian